Nippononebria pusilla is a species of black-coloured ground beetle in the Nebriinae subfamily that is endemic to Japan. The species has two subspecies, Nippononebria pusilla pusilla and Nippononebria pusilla yatsuana; both of these subspecies can be found in the same nation.

References

Beetles described in 1955
Beetles of Asia
Endemic fauna of Japan